Ross Snyder (1920–2008) was an American engineer best known for his contribution to recording techniques, most notably multi-tracking and early stereo recording.  In his time with Ampex (1952-1957) as Audio Product Planning Manager he introduced stereo to American commercial recording and in collaboration with Les Paul developed multi-tracking.

References

1920 births
2008 deaths
American audio engineers
20th-century American engineers